The CAFA futsal Championship is an international futsal competition in Central Asia for the member nations of the Central Asian Football Association (CAFA).

Results

Men's futsal
No edition took place yet or is planned currently.

Under-age tournaments

U-19 Men's futsal

References

External links
CAFA competitions – official website at the-cafa.com 

CAFA competitions
Futsal competitions in Asia